David L. Theisen (September 9, 1941 – December 9, 2014) was a professional sportsman who played both American football and Canadian football, for the Los Angeles Rams, the Toronto Argonauts, and the Winnipeg Blue Bombers.

References

1941 births
2014 deaths
Los Angeles Rams players
Toronto Argonauts players
Winnipeg Blue Bombers players
Place of birth missing
Nebraska Cornhuskers football players
Players of American football from Milwaukee
Sportspeople from Milwaukee
Marquette Golden Avalanche football players